Shiroky is an rural locality (a settlement, formerly urban-type settlement from 1957 to 2013) in Susumansky District of Magadan Oblast, Russia. Population:

Geography
Shiroky is located in the Upper Kolyma Highlands by the Byoryolyokh river.

References

Rural localities in Magadan Oblast